Sergo may refer to:

Surname
Ulderico Sergo (1913–1967), bantamweight professional boxer from Italy, who won the gold medal at the 1936 Summer Olympics in Berlin
Given name
Sergo Chakhoyan (born 1969), Armenian weightlifter who represented Australia later in his career
Sergo Goglidze (1901–1953), Georgian NKVD officer
Sergo Kldiashvili (1893–1986), Georgian prose-writer
Sergo Kobuladze (1909–1978), Georgian painter and illustrator
Sergo Ordzhonikidze (1886–1937), leading Soviet (Georgian) politician
Sergo Mikoyan (1929–2010), one of the Soviet Union's leading historians
Sergo Zakariadze (1909–1971), Georgian actor

Georgian masculine given names